Porto, a popular tourist destination in Portugal, is the country's second largest city. It is located along the Douro river estuary in Northern Portugal. Porto is one of the oldest European centers, and its historical core was classified a World Heritage Site by UNESCO in 1996.

Landmarks

Religious sites

Museums

Parks and gardens

Others

Nearby places

See also 

 Porto
 Tourism in Portugal

References

External links 
 Official website of Porto City Hall

Porto
Tourist attractions in Porto
Porto